Suneeva is a Canadian film production company located in Toronto, Ontario that produces TV commercials.

The awards 
Suneeva directors have won awards at: The ADCC's, The Bessies, AICP Awards, Clio Awards, Cannes Lions, London International Awards, Webbies, One Show and 2 consecutive best commercial director awards at the DGA Awards in 2009 and 2010.

Associations 
Suneeva is a member of the Association of Canadian Commercial Production (ACCP).

Corporate design 
Suneeva was recognized in the Taschen publication Brand Identity in 2009 for its corporate design.

Directors 
 Matt Aselton
 Andre Betz
 Matt Dilmore
 Devon Ferguson
 GDF
 Alma Har'el
 Kim Jacobs
 Ante Kovac
 Tom Kuntz
 Roman Laurent
 Shelley Lewis
 Mike Maguire
 Zach Math 
 John McDougall
 Matt Ogens
 Dugan O'Neal
 Matt Ogens 
 Mike Perry
 Martin Rodahl
 Rodrigo Saavedra
 Tom Scharpling
 Thomas Schauer
 Marc Sidelsky
 Matt Smukler
 James Stapelton 
 Pam Thomas

References

External links

Film production companies of Canada